USS Stromboli was a bomb brig of the United States Navy used in the Mexican–American War.

In 1846, the United States Navy purchased the brig Howard at Boston, Massachusetts to strengthen its forces for the Mexican–American War. Commissioned on 18 March 1847 Stromboli, named for the island of Stromboli in the Tyrrhenian Sea, the ship sailed for the Gulf of Mexico under the command of Commander William S. Walker.

Stromboli performed blockade duty in the Bay of Campeche, especially off the mouth of the Coatzacoalcos River. In mid-June, she sailed to the mouth of the Tabasco River. The force then moved upstream and took Tabasco the following day.

Stromboli later returned to blockade duty off the mouth of the Coatzacoalcos. That summer, the ship's crew was stricken by yellow fever, but she continued to help guard the U.S. Army water communications through the winter and spring.

In July 1848, Stromboli sailed home, and she was decommissioned on 6 September 1848. She was sold later that year.

References

Brigs of the United States Navy
Mexican–American War ships of the United States
1846 ships